The Canal de Brienne, also known as Canal de Saint-Pierre, is a French canal connecting the Garonne River with the Canal du Midi and the Canal de Garonne.  It has two locks. The lock opening to the Garonne is known as Ecluse Saint-Pierre.  The lock nearer to the Canal du Midi usually stands open.

The canal is in the centre of Toulouse, in the Midi-Pyrénées region of France. It runs for only   from its source at Bazacle on the Garonne to its terminal basin where it meets the Canal du Midi.  At the joining with the Canal du Midi is the Ponts Jumeaux.

The canal was inaugurated on 14 April 1776. It was intended to carry water from the Garonne to the Canal latéral à la Garonne and provide a navigable route to the port de la Daurade, situated in the centre of Toulouse on the Garonne.

It owes its name to Etienne Charles de Loménie de Brienne (1727–1794), archbishop of Toulouse.

See also
 List of canals in France

References

External links
 The French article from which this article was first translated
 The canal and the Ponts Jumeaux
Canal du Midi.com translated
360 degree rotating image of lock

Brienne
Canal du Midi
Canals opened in 1776